The 1992 New Hampshire gubernatorial election took place on November 3, 1992. Republican nominee Steve Merrill, who defeated Ed Dupont and Liz Hager for the Republican nomination, won the election, defeating Deborah Arnie Arnesen, who had defeated Norman D'Amours for the Democratic nomination.

Election results

References

See also

New Hampshire
1992
Gubernatorial